Peter Wyatt Wood (born 1953) is an American anthropologist and author. He is president of the National Association of Scholars, having been appointed to that office in 2009. He received a PhD in Anthropology in 1987 from the University of Rochester.


Publications

Books (selected)

References

External links
 
 

American anthropologists
Living people
1953 births
University of Rochester alumni
National_Association_of_Scholars